The Buckinghamshire Junction Railway, often known as the Yarnton Loop, was a standard gauge railway between Buckingham Junction on the Oxford, Worcester and Wolverhampton Railway (OW&WR) and Oxford Road Junction on the Buckinghamshire Railway.

Interchange station

Handborough station was the interchange for the line, and had a refreshment room built for the purpose. The OW&WR planned a "grand new interchange station" at Yarnton but it was never built.

Take-over by GWR
The OW&WR amalgamated with other railways to form the West Midland Railway (WMR) on 1 July 1860; and on 30 April 1861, the WMR and the Great Western Railway (GWR) reached an agreement under which they were to work closely together from 1 July 1861 with a view to full amalgamation. The GWR, WMR and the South Wales Railway (SWR) formally amalgamated on 1 August 1863 and did not continue connecting services with the rival L&NWR. The BJR remained open for freight, and was colloquially known as the Yarnton Loop.

Closure
British Railways closed the BJR in 1965. Since then the Woodstock Road crossing (ex-A34 road now A44 road) has been replaced with a roundabout, part of the A4260 road has been built along the trackbed and part of the A34 road has been built across the trackbed. The level crossing keeper's lodge still exists, and is now a private house.

References

Early British railway companies
Rail transport in Oxfordshire
Railway lines opened in 1854
Railway companies disestablished in 1862
1854 establishments in England
British companies disestablished in 1862